Rhinotitan (nose giant) is an extinct genus of brontothere from the Eocene of  Mongolia, where three species were described from the Shara Murun formation. The genus included medium to large brontotheres which had long skulls with nasal horns. Like other solid-horned brontotheres, Rhinotitan was sexually dimorphic in horn size. In living mammals, this pattern is found in species that live in groups; males have the larger horns, and use them in ritualized combats with other males to decide control of territories that offer breeding access to females. Most horned brontotheres had dish-shaped skulls assumed to be adapted for such combats. However, the skull of Rhinotitan was concave only near the front; the top and back of the skull was rounded in a way similar to hornless brontotheres. The functional significance of this character is unknown.

It weighed 1.5 tons. Tooth analysis indicates that, like other brontotheres, it was a herbivore adapted to browse on leaves.

References

 Classification of Mammals by Malcolm C. McKenna and Susan K. Bell

Brontotheres
Eocene odd-toed ungulates
Eocene mammals of Asia
Fossil taxa described in 1943
Brontotheres of Asia